= Khad Bamuliya =

- village
- Location within Madhya Pradesh Location within India
- Coordinates: 23.112136°N 77.480213°E
- Country: India
- State: Madhya Pradesh
- District: Bhopal
- Tehsil: Huzur

Population (2011)
  - Total: 114
- Time zone: UTC+5:30 (IST)
- ISO 3166 code: MP-IN
- Census code: 482538

Khad Bamuliya is a village in the Bhopal district of Madhya Pradesh, India. It is located in the Huzur tehsil and the Phanda block.

== Demographics ==
According to the 2011 census of India, Khad Bamuliya has 28 households. The effective literacy rate (i.e. the literacy rate of population excluding children aged 6 and below) is 71.58%.

Demographics (2011 Census)
	Total	Male	Female
Population	114	68	46
Children aged below 6 years	19	12	7
Scheduled caste	35	21	14
Scheduled tribe	28	18	10
Literates	68	45	23
Workers (all)	68	40	28
Main workers (total)	30	27	3
Main workers: Cultivators	6	4	2
Main workers: Agricultural labourers	11	10	1
Main workers: Household industry workers	0	0	0
Main workers: Other	13	13	0
Marginal workers (total)	38	13	25
Marginal workers: Cultivators	0	0	0
Marginal workers: Agricultural labourers	37	13	24
Marginal workers: Household industry workers	0	0	0
Marginal workers: Others	1	0	1
Non-workers	46	28	18
